{{DISPLAYTITLE:C15H22O4}}
The molecular formula C15H22O4 (molar mass: 266.333 g/mol, exact mass: 266.1518 u) may refer to:

 Agglomerin
 Leptospermone

Molecular formulas